Keir Beck is an Australian stuntman and film director based on the Gold Coast. He works out of, and is founder of, the stunt training venue AP8.

Keir Beck is known for his work on Mad Max: Fury Road (2015), Casino Royale (2006) and San Andreas (2015).

Life and career
Keir grew up in Perth, Western Australia. He moved to the Gold Coast where he joined the film and television industry.

His experience with rope access as an arborist and rock climber gained him a reputation in the industry as a stunt rigger.

He spent eight months in the Namibian desert filming Mad Max: Fury Road, for which he won a Screen Actors Guild Award for Outstanding Performance by a Stunt Ensemble in a Motion Picture, two Taurus Awards for Best Stunt Rigging and Best Stunt Coordination and/or 2nd Unit Direction and an OFTA Film Award for Best Stunt Coordination.
Most recently Keir received the SAG award for Outstanding Performance by a Stunt Ensemble in a Motion Picture for Hacksaw Ridge. He recently worked on the Bollywood film Squad, while it was shooting in Minsk, Belarus.

Filmography
Squad - Stunt coordinator
In Like Flynn - 2nd unit Director, stunt coordinator
Flammable Children - Stunt coordinator 
Bleeding Steel - 2nd Unit Director, stunt coordinator 
Pirates of the Caribbean: Dead Men Tell No Tales – Key Stunt Rigger 2017 
Hacksaw Ridge – Stunt Coordinator 2016 
Max Steel – Utility Stunts 2016 
The Nice Guys – Stunt Rigging Coordinator 2016
The Darkness – Key Stunt Rigger 2016 
Gifted (Short) – Action Coordinator, Stunt Coordinator 2015
Insidious: Chapter 3 – Utility Stunts 2015 
San Andreas – Camera Operator, Stunts, Utility Stunts 2015 
Mad Max: Fury Road – Stunt Coordinator, Stunt Rigging Coordinator 2015 
Jupiter Ascending – Stunt Rigging Coordinator 2015 
Last Days in the Desert – Stunt Coordinator (key stunt rigger) 2015
Mental – Key Stunt Rigger 2012 
Sherlock Holmes: A Game of Shadows – Stunt Performer, Stunt Rigging Coordinator (uncredited) 2011
Killer Elite – Key Stunt Rigger (uncredited), Stunt Rigging Coordinator (uncredited) 2011
Yogi Bear – Camera Department 2010 
Daybreakers – Assistant Stunt Coordinator 2009 
X-Men Origins: Wolverine – Camera Operator 2009
Knowing – Camera Operator 2009
Push – Key Stunt Rigger 2009
Australia – Camera Operator 2008 
The Condemned – Stunt Rigger 2007
Ghost Rider – Key Stunt Rigger (as Kier Beck) 2007
Casino Royale – Stunt Rigger (uncredited), Stunts 2006
The Marine – Stunt Rigger 2006
Superman Returns – Stunt Performer 2006
Kokoda: 39th Battalion – Stunts 2006
Voodoo Lagoon – Assistant Stunt Coordinator 2006
The Great Raid – Stunt Performer 2005
House of Wax – Key Stunt Rigger 2005
Son of the Mask – Key Stunt Rigger, Stunt Performer 2005
Lakshya – Assistant Stunt Coordinator 2004
Monster – Stunts (uncredited) 2003
Peter Pan – Key Stunt Rigger, Stunt Performer 2003
The Matrix Revolutions – Stunts 2003
The Matrix Reloaded – Stunts 2003
Kangaroo Jack – Stunt Performer 2003
Dirty Deeds – Stunt Double 2002
Scooby-Doo – Stunt Rigger 2002
Queen of the Damned – Stunt Rigger 2002
Cubbyhouse – Stunts Rigger 2001
Crocodile Dundee in Los Angeles – Thug 2001
Yolngu Boy – Assistant Stunt Coordinator 2001
Pitch Black – Stunt Rigger 2000
Diamondbacks (Video) – Stunt Double 1999
Night Wings – Key Stunt Rigger 1998

References

1970 births
Australian stunt performers
Living people